Kadavar is a German rock band from Berlin, founded in 2010. Their retro style, incorporating psychedelic rock and stoner rock, has been compared to bands of the 1970s hard rock/heavy metal era such as Led Zeppelin and Black Sabbath. Kadavar currently consists of guitarist/lead vocalist Christoph "Lupus" Lindemann, drummer Christoph "Tiger" Bartelt and bassist Simon "Dragon" Bouteloup.

History 

In 2010, drummer Bartelt and guitarist Philipp "Mammut" Lippitz began playing together. They became a band when Lindemann joined as bassist and vocalist. Lindemann decided to switch to guitar, allowing Lippitz to switch to bass. Their first recording, an eponymous two-song CD-R, was self-released on 25 August 2011.

On 12 July 2012, Kadavar's self-titled debut album was released on Tee Pee Records.

A collaboration with the band Aqua Nebula Oscillator resulted in the release of the White Ring album in November 2012.

Due to visa problems, a planned U.S. tour could not take place, although the band did appear at the South by Southwest festival in Austin, Texas on 15 March 2013. While in Texas, the band recorded various video clips of themselves which were later used to create the music video for their song "Come Back Life", which was produced by Bartelt.

In July 2013, Lippitz left the band to concentrate on his new group the Loranes. He was replaced by Bouteloup, previously of metal band the Oath. After several live performances, Bouteloup was officially announced as a new member.

Their second album, Abra Kadavar, was released on 12 April 2013 by Nuclear Blast, and debuted at No. 42 on the German charts.

In early 2014, Kadavar started touring with fellow retro-style hard rock band Wolfmother. In July 2014, Wolfmother jammed and recorded a few songs in Kadavar's studio. On 6 June 2014, Kadavar released a live album, Live in Antwerp.

In June 2015, Kadavar announced their third album, Berlin, on their Facebook page. It was released by Nuclear Blast on 21 August and included a cover of Nico's "Reich der Träume" as a bonus track. The album entered the charts in several countries, hitting No. 18 in Germany and No. 40 in Belgium.

In 2015, drummer Bartelt co-wrote the song "Wedding" with Andrew Stockdale. It was released on 19 February 2016 as a bonus track on Wolfmother's fourth album, Victorious.

Kadavar's fourth album, Rough Times, was released on 29 September 2017.

Their fifth album, For the Dead Travel Fast, was released on 11 October 2019.

On their own record label, Robotor Records, Kadavar released a split vinyl single with Lucifer on 19 March 2021, to which they contributed a cover of "The Green Manalishi (With the Two Prong Crown)" by Fleetwood Mac.

Style 
In the studio, Kadavar use "hard-panning" production techniques (guitar tracks on the left channel, bass on the right, drums on the inside right and vocals in the middle) to accurately reproduce the sound of their live performances. Their style has been categorized to have a "riffed psych rock and doom-like sound" with influences from Black Sabbath, The Doors, Hawkwind and Led Zeppelin.

Band members 
Current members
 Christoph "Lupus" Lindemann – guitar, vocals (2010–present), bass guitar (2010)
 Christoph "Tiger" Bartelt – drums (2010–present)
 Simon "Dragon" Bouteloup – bass guitar (2013–present)

Former members
 Philipp "Mammut" Lippitz – bass guitar (2010–2013), guitar (2010)

Discography 
Studio albums
 Kadavar (2012, Tee Pee Records)
 Abra Kadavar (2013, Nuclear Blast)
 Berlin (2015, Nuclear Blast)
 Rough Times (2017, Nuclear Blast)
 For the Dead Travel Fast (2019, Nuclear Blast)
 The Isolation Tapes (2020, Robotor Records)

Singles and EPs
 Kadavar CD single (2011, self-released)
 Creature of the Demon 7" single (2012, This Charming Man Records)
 The Old Man digital single (2015, Nuclear Blast)
 Everything Is Changing (2020, Robotor Records)

Live albums
 Live in Antwerp (2014, Nuclear Blast)
 Live in Copenhagen (2018, Nuclear Blast)

Collaborative albums
 White Ring (2012, with Aqua Nebula Oscillator)
 A Story of Darkness & Light: Music by Elder & Kadavar (2021, released under the name Eldovar)

References

External links 

 

2010 establishments in Germany
German psychedelic rock music groups
Musical groups established in 2010
Musical groups from Berlin
German hard rock musical groups
German musical trios